White Fang is a novel by Jack London.

White Fang may also refer to:

Adaptations of the novel
 White Fang (1925 film), an American silent film directed by Laurence Trimble
 White Fang (1936 film), an American film directed by David Butler
 The White Fang, a 1946 Soviet film directed by Aleksandr Zguridi
 White Fang (1973 film), an Italian film directed by Lucio Fulci
 White Fang (1991 film), an American film directed by Randal Kleiser
 White Fang (1991 animated film), an Australian animated film produced by Burbank Animation Studios
 White Fang (TV series), a 1993 television series
 White Fang (1997 animated film), and American animated film
 White Fang (2018 film), a French animated film directed by Alexandre Espigares

Other uses
 White Fang (puppet), a character on the Soupy Sales television show
 White Fang (Mobile Suit Gundam Wing), a fictional organization in the Japanese anime Mobile Suit Gundam Wing
 White Fang (RWBY), a fictional organization in the American animated web series RWBY
 White Fang, a band featuring Erik Gage, founder of Gnar Tapes